Alexander Vasilevich Tatarinov (born 14 April 1982) is a Russian professional ice hockey winger who currently plays for Metallurg Novokuznetsk of the Kontinental Hockey League (KHL).

Career statistics

Regular season and playoffs

International

References

External links

1982 births
Living people
Amur Khabarovsk players
Arizona Coyotes draft picks
Avtomobilist Yekaterinburg players
Chelmet Chelyabinsk players
Dizel Penza players
HC Almaty players
HC Donbass players
HC Spartak Moscow players
Khimik Voskresensk (KHL) players
Kristall Saratov players
Lokomotiv Yaroslavl players
Metallurg Novokuznetsk players
Molot-Prikamye Perm players
Russian ice hockey left wingers
Sportspeople from Yekaterinburg